John Bulteel (c. 1627–1692) was an English writer and translator, cousin of John Bulteel, Member of Parliament. He was descended from French Huguenots.

Works
Identifiable works of Bulteel include:

London's Triumph, or the Solemn and Magnificent reception of that honourable gentleman, Robert Tichburn, Lord Major, dated October 1656. The reception was by Oliver Cromwell.
Berinthea, 1664, a romance.
Amorous Orontus, or Love in Fashion, 1665, a translation in heroic verse of Thomas Corneille's Amour à la Mode
Rome exactly described, 1668, translation of two discourses of Angelo Corraro, Venetian ambassador to Pope Alexander VII.
Translation from 1683 of François Eudes de Mézeray's General Chronological History of France.
Apophthegmes of the Ancients, taken out of Plutarch and others, collected into one volume for the benefit and pleasure of the Ingenious, 1683.

The Drudge: Or, the Jealous Extravagant of 1673, a translation by B.J. of a work by René Le Pays, has been tentatively attributed to Bulteel.

Notes

Attribution

English writers
17th-century English writers
17th-century English male writers
1627 births
1692 deaths
Huguenots